Jangaon railway station (station code: ZN) is an Indian Railways station in Jangaon of Telangana. It lies on the Nagpur–Hyderabad line and is administered under Secunderabad railway division of South Central Railway zone.

It was constructed by Nizam's Guaranteed State Railway in 1879. This railway line connects Hyderabad with Warangal, and was later extended to Bezawada. Falaknuma–Jangaon MEMU is a Hyderabad suburban train service starts from this station.

See also 
 List of railway stations in India

References 

Railway stations in Jangaon district
Secunderabad railway division
Jangaon district